The Police is a self-titled compilation album released by the Police on 5 June 2007, to both celebrate the 30th anniversary of their recording debut and accompany their reunion tour. It contains 28 tracks over two discs, a mixture of hit singles and fan favourites. All the singles are included, with the exception of "Secret Journey" and '"Don't Stand So Close to Me '86" (though the original version of the latter from the album Zenyatta Mondatta is included). International editions contain two bonus tracks, "The Bed's Too Big Without You" from Reggatta de Blanc (which was originally released as a single as part of the Six Pack seven-inch singles collection in 1980) and "Rehumanize Yourself" from Ghost in the Machine. The band's non-studio album debut single, "Fall Out", originally recorded in 1977 (with the band's first guitarist Henry Padovani), is also included; other than Message in a Box: The Complete Recordings (1993) the song has never been included on any other Police album.

The Police debuted at number 11 on the U.S. Billboard 200 albums chart, selling approximately 58,000 copies in its first week.

Track listing

* Bonus tracks on UK edition.

Personnel
Stewart Copeland – drums, percussion, synthesizer, rhythm guitar on "Fall Out", backing vocals
Sting – bass guitar, lead and backing vocals, oboe, saxophone, synthesizer, harmonica on "So Lonely", drum machine on "Synchronicity I"
Andy Summers – guitar, synthesizer, piano, backing vocals (except on "Fall Out")
Henry Padovani – guitar solo on "Fall Out"
John Sinclair – piano on "Hole in My Life"
Jean Roussel – piano on "Every Little Thing She Does Is Magic"

Charts

Weekly charts

Year-end charts

Certifications

References

2007 compilation albums
A&M Records albums
Albums produced by Hugh Padgham
Albums produced by Nigel Gray
The Police compilation albums